The 2019–20 VMI Keydets basketball team represented the Virginia Military Institute during the 2019–20 NCAA Division I men's basketball season. The Keydets were led by fifth-year head coach Dan Earl and played their home games in Cameron Hall in Lexington, Virginia, their home since 1981, as members of the Southern Conference. They finished the season 9–24, 3–15 in SoCon play to finish in ninth place. They defeated Samford in the first round of the SoCon tournament before losing to East Tennessee State in the quarterfinals.

Previous season 
The Keydets finished the 2018–19 campaign with a 11–21, 4–14 in SoCon play to finish in eighth place. They lost in the quarterfinals of the SoCon tournament to Wofford. It was the first year in five years the Keydets won a SoCon Tournament game.

Roster

Schedule and results

|-
!colspan=9 style=|Regular season

|-
!colspan=9 style=| SoCon tournament
|-

|-

Source

References 

VMI Keydets basketball seasons
VMI
VMI Keydets bask
VMI Keydets bask